Rayn (also Romanized as Rāyen; also known as Rāyni) is a city and capital of Rayn District, in Kerman County, Kerman Province, Iran. At the 2006 Census, its population was 9,623, in 2,405 families. The Rayen Castle is located here, a site of notable historical events.

References

Populated places in Kerman County
Cities in Kerman Province